SASE may refer to:

 Sarajevo Stock Exchange, in Bosnia and Herzegovina
 Secure access service edge, a networking and security technology
 Self-addressed stamped envelope, used for expediting a reply via mail
 Self-amplified spontaneous emission, a process by which a laser beam is created
 Snow and Avalanche Study Establishment, a laboratory of the India Defence Research & Development Organization
 Specific application service element, in the OSI computer networking model

See also
 Sase (disambiguation)